The Messengers Choir was an East African gospel group based in the United States.
Before the break-up they were considered the first gospel choir of African origin to be formed and based in the United States.

The group was formed in New Jersey, USA. The 30+ member ensemble blended elements of African gospel and American popular music.
The group was an integral part of the Allegheny East Conference Seventh-day Adventist Church Festivals.

References
 Official Website 
 Public Eye 

American gospel musical groups